is a private university in Kyoto, Japan that belongs to the Rinzai sect (specifically the Myōshin-ji temple complex, which it is next to). The university and the neighborhood are named for Emperor Hanazono, whose donated his palace to make Myōshin-ji.

It is a major competitor of the Sōtō college in Tokyo known as Komazawa University. Despite the university's sectarian affiliation, the school accepts Soto students. The school operates two research centers important in Zen academia, i.e. the Institute for Zen Studies and the International Research Institute for Zen Buddhism. Founded in 1872 as a seminary for those interested in the priesthood, the university carries on that tradition while offering an education to those uninterested in becoming a priest. The university's president is Dr. Kosan Abe. Former presidents include Eshin Nishimura.

Notes

References

External links
http://www.hanazono.ac.jp/english/

Educational institutions established in 1872
Hanazono University
Buddhist universities and colleges in Japan
Private universities and colleges in Japan
Rinzai school
1872 establishments in Japan